Deulgaon, commonly known as Deulgaon Kol, is a village located in Sindkhed Raja taluka of Buldhana district, in state of Maharashtra, India.

Demographics
According to the 2011 census:
Deulgaon Kol has 638 families residing. The village has population of 2878.
Out of the population of 2878, 1525 are males while 1353 are females. 
Literacy rate of the village is 77.51%.
Average sex ratio of the village is 887 females to 1000 males. Average sex ratio of Maharashtra state is 929.

Geography, and transport

References

Villages in Buldhana district